"Royal William" can refer to 

Royal William, a 32-gun fifth rate ship of the Royal Scottish Navy, renamed  in 1707 following the Act of Union, and sunk in 1709
 HMS Royal William, two ships of the Royal Navy
 SS Royal William, Canadian ship launched in 1831 and the first ship that crossed the Atlantic Ocean almost continually under steam power 1833. (Later sold to the Spanish Navy)
 Royal William rose, a red hybrid tea rose, registered in 1984 by the German rose firm Wilhelm Kordes